Beta Sigma Psi National Lutheran Fraternity, commonly known as Beta Sig, is a United States social organization for Lutheran college men. Founded at the University of Illinois in 1925, the fraternity has more than 7,500 initiated members. It has twelve chapters, primarily in the mid-west, and over 300 undergraduate members.

Purpose
Beta Sigma Psi's purpose is to create an environment where the Lutheran college man can grow spiritually, scholastically, and socially. The fraternity undertakes programs designed to develop leaders, along with character, intellectual awareness, social responsibility, spiritual welfare, brotherhood, integrity, friendship, and justice.

History

Founding
In 1911, Rev. Frederick William Gustav Stiegemeyer accepted a position at St. John's Evangelical Lutheran Church in Champaign, Illinois. As part of his ministry, he was to serve the students at the University of Illinois. In the fall of 1919, Stiegemeyer organized the Lutheran Illini League with ten students. The Lutheran Illini League met weekly for religious instructions and discussions on contemporary issues. In the fall of 1920, the group had twenty members and rented a house. In early 1921, it reorganized as the Concordia Club.

By 1923, the Concordia Club was active on campus and adopted the name Concordia Fraternity. Its members planned to expand into a new national  Greek letter fraternity. Its founders were:

Expansion
The Concordia Fraternity at Champaign corresponded with the Rev. Paul Schmidt, who had formed a similar organization at Purdue University for students. In May 1925, Alpha chapter members drove to Purdue to help organize the Beta chapter. Within months, the first National Council of Beta Sigma Psi was elected. Gamma chapter formed at the University of Michigan (1928) and Delta chapter at the University of Nebraska (1929). By this time, the Alpha chapter was building a new house.

When the depression of the 1930s hit, fraternity financing became very difficult. The Gamma chapter closed in 1933, and the Alpha chapter closed in 1940. During World War II, Beta Sigma Psi had only two active chapters, Beta and Delta, with a combined membership of fourteen men. An undergraduate member from the Delta chapter, Delmar Lienemann, was elected secretary-treasurer of the national fraternity, serving for 22 years. The fraternity's named its highest honor for Lienemann.

In 1949, the Epsilon chapter formed at Iowa State University. Expansion continued over the next few years as the Zeta chapter organized at Kansas State University in 1951, and the Eta chapter followed at the University of Missouri–Rolla in 1952. That year at the National Council meeting in Ames, Iowa, John Hingst, an alumnus of the Beta chapter, was elected national president and served for fourteen years in that position. In 1955, the Alpha chapter was reactivated. In 1962, the Iota chapter formed at the University of Missouri.

In the 1960s, chapters formed at Western Michigan University, Eastern Illinois University, and the University of Minnesota. Dick Weiss, an alumnus of the Epsilon chapter, became the fraternity's first salaried secretary-treasurer. The national headquarters moved from Omaha, Nebraska to St. Louis, Missouri. In 1969, Beta Sigma Psi became a full member of the National Interfraternity Conference (NIC), the first "niche" fraternity to be recognized as a full member of NIC.

Walter E. Rose, the campus pastor at Eastern Illinois University and pastoral adviser to the Mu chapter, moved to St. Louis in 1971 to succeed Dick Weiss as executive director. Rose helped to form Phi Beta Chi Lutheran sorority at the University of Illinois and served as the executive director of both organizations.

Challenge and resolve
From the 1970s through the early 1990s, around two-thirds of its chapters closed, including the Delta chapter which had the most initiated members of any Beta Sig chapter. Craig Varner of the Iota chapter was elected national president in 1996. Under his leadership, the fraternity created an annual membership education forum and revived its leadership academy. The expansion focus shifted from large universities to smaller colleges. With these changes, Beta Sigma Psi led all national fraternities in 1999 with a 97% increase in associate members from the previous academic year. During the first part of the 21st century, Beta Sigma Psi has continued to grow and the Delta chapter was rechartered in 2006.

Symbols
Luther's Emblem or seal consists of a black cross inside of a red heart inside of a rose and represents the Lutheran faith. It is incorporated into the coat of arms and the badge. The badge consists of a black cross contained in a heart that is superimposed on top of a golden rose (Luther's Emblem). The emblem is placed on a shield with the Greek letters  in an arc above the rose. The variation of the badge includes eighteen pearls bordering the shield. The badge is worn by activated members.

The fraternity's flag consists of a coat of arms set upon a field of cardinal red and white with letters in the upper left quadrant. The banner consists of the coat of arms set upon a cardinal red and white field. The gold rose is the fraternity's official flower. The fraternity's publication and yearly national formal are also named after the flower.

Chapters
There are twelve active chapters, indicated in bold; inactive chapters are in italics.

Notes

Graduate organizations
Beta Sigma Psi consists of three separate alumni corporations, each with a specific mission, purpose, and board of directors. The three corporations are the National Fraternity, the Education Foundation, and the Housing Foundation.

Notable alumni
Norbert T. Tiemann, Delta chapter – Governor of Nebraska
Lloyd Karmeier, Alpha chapter – justice, Supreme Court of Illinois
Brian Bosma, Beta chapter – speaker, Indiana House of Representatives
Edward Mueller, Eta chapter – chairman and CEO, Qwest

See also
List of social fraternities and sororities

References

 
Christian organizations established in 1925
Student organizations established in 1925
Lutheran organizations
North American Interfraternity Conference
University of Illinois Urbana-Champaign
Belleville, Illinois
1925 establishments in Illinois